Belvedere Lake is a small lake located east-northeast of the Hamlet of Roseboom in the Town of Roseboom in Otsego County, New York.

References 

Lakes of New York (state)
Lakes of Otsego County, New York